Tremail is a hamlet in Cornwall, England, UK. It is about one mile southeast of Davidstow. Higher Tremail Farm and Trewinnow are nearby.

References

Hamlets in Cornwall